Sait-Kurzya (Säyet-Köryä) is a rural locality (a village) in Tangatarovsky Selsoviet, Burayevsky District, Bashkortostan, Russia. The population was 137 as of 2010. There are three streets.

Geography 
Sait-Kurzya is located 40 km west of Burayevo (the district's administrative centre) by road. Starokurzya is the nearest rural locality.

References 

Rural localities in Burayevsky District